Wilmorton is a suburb of the city of Derby, England.  It is situated between Alvaston and Osmaston, to the south of the city centre on the A6 from Deadman's Lane to the Canal Bridge; the former is aligned to the old town boundary and named from the medieval track that lead to the plague pit dug 1348 during the Great Plague or Black Death.  Victims of the Black Death were buried there (the burial site is now under Pride Park).  It was given the name Wilmorton by the post office in 1887.  The area was named after Reverend Sir George Wilmot-Horton, 5th Baronet of Osmaston and was formed out of the Osmaston Hall estate which was broken up in the 1880s.

Most of the original houses were built by the Midland Railway Company.  A school was opened in 1893 and in 1904 a church in red brick dedicated to Saint Osmund was constructed.  In 1796, the Derby Canal was built through Wilmorton which helped to bring a lot of trade to this area.  The canal was closed in 1964 and converted to a cycle track, but work is being undertaken to restore it.  A local public house next to the canal, named The Navigation, was originally built in 1796 when the canal opened, and re-built in 1895 to a design by the Derby architect James Wright.  The other public house in Wilmorton is the Portland Hotel; this is on the corner of the London Road and Dickinson Street - and adjacent to Deadman's Lane.

Behind the housing the London Midland and Scottish Railway Company constructed a railway college in 1937 in a neo-classical style. This is now known as Derby Conference centre. Wilmorton campus of Derby College was built off Harrow Street (known as Derby College of Further Education and then Derby Tertiary College) and in around 2006 this was knocked down and redeveloped as housing - known as City Point. Some of the college facilities were transferred to a site on Nottingham Road called Mason's Place, and some to the main site in Mackworth.   In the late 1990s, a new section of the A6 was built from here to "The Cockpitt" roundabout, passing through Pride Park, known as Pride Parkway.

In 2013 local Councillor Linda Winter called a meeting at the YMCA on London Road to set up a Residents Association for the Wilmorton area. From this meeting it was clear that the now housing development at City Point had further issues specific to its construction so on 5 June 2013 they held another meeting just for City Point Residents.  The residents have formed their own Residents Association - Called City Point Residents Association - which intends to be under the governance of the Wilmorton Residents Association when it is finally formed.  City Point Residents also have a Facebook page for general discussions.

References

Areas of Derby